C15orf54 (Chromosome 15 Open Reading Frame 54) is a protein in humans that is encoded by the C6orf54 gene. This gene is mostly conserved in mammals, primarily primates. While the function of the gene is currently unknown, the gene has shown high expression in the prostate, thymus, appendix, bone marrow, and lungs.

Gene 
C15orf54 is located on chromosome 15 from 39542870 to 39547048 on the direct strand. This gene is 4,180 bases in length. The gene is otherwise known as LOC400360 or FLJ39531. The gene contains 2 distinct gt-ag introns and two exons with two alternatively spliced mRNAs, both encoding the same protein. The NCBI accession number is NC_000015.10.

mRNA

Isoforms 
C15orf54 has a total of 2 isoforms: variant 1 and variant 2. Variant 1 represents the longer transcript and variant 2 uses an alternate splice site in the 3' exon compared to variant 1.

Variant 1 
The complete mRNA is 3095 bp long and contains 2 exons. The 5' UTR contains 383 bp with an in frame stop 48 bp before the Met. The 3' UTR contains 2160 bp followed by the polyA. The standard AATAAA polyadenylation signal is seen about 23 bp before the polyA. The predicted protein product has 183 aa.

Protein

General properties 
The sequence for the C15orf54 protein is as follows:MEVKFITGKHGGRRPQRAEPQRICRALWLTPWPSLILKLLSWIILSNLFLHLRATHHMTE

LPLRFLYIALSEMTFREQTSHQIIQQMSLSNKLEQNQLYGEVINKETDNPVISSGLTLLF

AQKPQSPGWKNMSSTKRVCTILADSCRAQAHAADRGERGHFGVQILHHFIEVFNVMAVRS

NPFThe dominant protein product is 183 amino acids long and has a predicted molecular weight of 21 kDa. The isoelectric point is 9.87. C15orf54 has a relatively high frequency of leucine at 12.0% and a relatively low frequency of tyrosine at 1.1%. The number of multiplets in this sequence is 12. There are no unusual spacings in this protein.

Domains and Motifs 
Analysis of C15orf54 showed a globular domain with multiple motif functional sites. One site is the MAPK-docking motif, which consists of one or more basic and two to four hydrophobic residues in adjacent groups. These motifs regulate specific interactions in the MAPK cascade. Another such site is the LIR motif which is a part of the Atg8 protein family ligands and plays a role in selective autophagy by recruiting specific adaptors bound to ubiquitylated proteins, organelles, or pathogens for degradation.

Post-translational modification 
C15orf54 is non-myristoylated. There was also no sulfinated sites found in this protein. One motif with a high probability of post translational modification sumoylation sites were found. Sumoylation sites are involved in nuclear-cytosolic transport, transcriptional regulation and protein stability.

Secondary structure 
C15orf54 is composed of both alpha helices and beta sheets, as well as turns and some coils. Alpha helices constituted the majority of the protein.

Sub-cellular Localization 
The membrane topology was determined to be type 1b with a cytoplasmic tail from 34 to 183, indicating that the C-terminal side will be inside. There was a transmembrane region located from 34 to 50. There were dileucine motifs found in the tail at 39 and 118.

Interacting Proteins 
Two interacting proteins were found, lsd2_drome and npfr_drome. Lsd2_drome is a lipid storage droplet surface binding protein and npfr_drome is a neuropeptide F receptor.

Regulation

Gene regulation

Promoter 
C15orf54 has one predicted promoter sequence. GXP_6084 is located from 39249718 to 39250757 on the plus strand of chromosome 15 and is composed of 1040 bp.

Transcription factor binding sites 
The following table displays the transcription factors most likely to bind to the GXP_6084 promoter for C15orf54.

Expression pattern 
The gene has shown high expression in the prostate, thymus, appendix, bone marrow, and lungs. NCBI AceView shows that the gene is moderately expressed.

Transcription regulation

miRNA targeting 
TargetScan showed that miRNA hsa-miR-375 was highly conserved across various organisms. This miRNA is specifically expressed in the pancreatic islets, brain, and spinal cord. This miRNA has also been shown to be associated with different cancers, including breast and gastric cancer.

Homology

Rate of evolution

Paralogs 
No paralogs of C15orf54 have been detected in the human genome.

Orthologs 
Orthologs were primarily found in primates, although many different mammals also exhibited sizeable sequence similarity to the human C15orf54 sequence. Below is a table of selected orthologs sorted by date of divergence for the C15orf54 gene, including closely and distantly related orthologs. C15orf54 was shown to evolve relatively quickly and evenly over time with a faster rate than both Cytochrome C and Fibrinogen Alpha.

Clinical significance 
C15orf54 was associated with hypertrophy-associated polymorphisms in heart failure risk and Atherosclerosis risk. C15orf54 was also positively correlated with higher survival rates in patients with gastric cancer. It was also shown to be a locus of interest in determining the glomerular filtration rate in a pool of individuals with Mongolian ancestry

References 

